The Cárcamo de Dolores (Sump of Dolores) is a hydraulic structure located on the Second Section of Chapultepec Park, in Mexico City, comprising the building designed by architect Ricardo Rivas, inside the originally underwater mural Agua, el origen de la vida ("Water, source of life") of Mexican muralist Diego Rivera, the art installation Cámara Lambdoma by Ariel Guzik, and in outside, the Tlaloc Fountain, also of Rivera.

The building was constructed in 1951 to commemorate the end of the works in 1943 of the Lerma System, which still supply water to Mexico City and still flows in the place, but diverted from own building. It is part of the Museo de Historia Natural y Cultura Ambiental (Museum of Natural History and Environmental Culture).

See also
 Mexican muralism
 Diego Rivera

References

Chapultepec
Fountains in Mexico
Murals in Mexico
Works by Diego Rivera
1950s murals
Buildings and structures in Mexico City
Buildings and structures completed in 1951
Tourist attractions in Mexico City